The 1979 Pacific Coast Athletic Association men's basketball tournament (now known as the Big West Conference men's basketball tournament) was held March 1–3 at the Anaheim Convention Center in Anaheim, California.

Top-seeded Pacific topped PCAA-newcomers Utah State in the championship game, 82–73, to win its first PCAA/Big West men's basketball tournament. 

The Tigers, in turn, received a bid to the 1979 NCAA tournament. They were joined in the tournament by Utah State, who earned an at-large bid.

Format
The tournament field expanded once more, this time increasing from seven to eight teams (UC Irvine and Utah State participated in their first PCAA tournament). Previous member San Diego State had departed for the Western Athletic Conference prior to the 1978–79 season. 

All eight PCAA members qualified for the event and were seeded based on regular season conference records. All teams began play in the tournament bracket's first round.

Bracket

Notes

References

Big West Conference men's basketball tournament
Tournament
Pacific Coast Athletic Association men's basketball tournament
Pacific Coast Athletic Association men's basketball tournament